12th World Soundtrack Awards
October 20, 2012

Best Original Soundtrack:
 Tinker Tailor Soldier Spy 
The 12th World Soundtrack Awards were given on 20 October 2012 at the Kuipke Events Centre in Ghent, Belgium.

Awards

World Soundtrack of the Year
Tinker Tailor Soldier Spy by Alberto Iglesias
The Adventures of Tintin: The Secret of the Unicorn by John Williams
Hugo by Howard Shore
Drive by Cliff Martinez
The Ides of March by Alexandre Desplat

Soundtrack Composer of the Year
Alberto Iglesias for Tinker Tailor Soldier Spy, The Skin I Live In & The Monk
Howard Shore for A Dangerous Method, Cosmopolis & Hugo
Alexandre Desplat  for Moonrise Kingdom, The Ides of March, Extremely Loud and Incredibly Close, A Better Life, Carnage & Rust and Bone
Cliff Martinez for Contagion & Drive
John Williams for War Horse & The Adventures of Tintin: The Secret of the Unicorn

Best Original Song Written for Film
Glenn Close (lyrics), Sinéad O'Connor (performer), Brian Byrne (music) for "Lay Your Head Down" in Albert Nobbs
Florence Welch (lyrics/music), Isabella Summers (lyrics/music), Florence + the Machine (performer) for "Breath of Life" in Snow White and the Huntsman
Madonna (music/lyrics/performer), Julie Frost (music/lyrics), James Harry (music/lyrics) for "Masterpiece in W.E.
Damon Thomas (music/lyrics), Thomas Newman (music/lyrics), Harvey Mason, Jr. (music/lyrics), Mary J. Blige (music/lyrics/performer) for "The Living Proof" in The Help
Bret McKenzie (music/lyrics), Peter Linz (performer), Jason Segel (performer) for "Man or Muppet" in The Muppets

Discovery of the Year
Albert Nobbs by Brian Byrne
Immortals by Trevor Morris
Take Shelter by David Wingo
Lola Versus & Nobody Walks by Fall On Your Sword
The Raven, Sleep Tight, Cold Light of Day by Lucas Vidal

Public Choice Award
Abel Korzeniowski for W.E.

Lifetime Achievement Award
Pino Donaggio

References

External links
World Soundtrack Academy

2012
2012 film awards
2012 music awards